Laxmibil is a village located in the West Tripura District, Tripura, India. The population is 6,684. 3,521 people are male. 3,163 are female.

References

Villages in West Tripura district